Thuria may refer to:

 Thuria (Messenia), a town of ancient Messenia, Greece
 Thuria, Messenia, a modern town in Greece taking its name from the ancient town
 Thuria, the fictional Martian name of the Mars moon Phobos in the Barsoom novels by Edgar Rice Burroughs
 Thuria, a kingdom in the Pellucidar novels by Edgar Rice Burroughs
 Thuria, a fictional region used by Robert E. Howard in his Kull stories